Sun Yat-sen is an outdoor sculpture depicting the Chinese physician, writer, and philosopher of the same name by Beniamino Bufano, installed in San Francisco's Saint Mary's Square, in 1937,  in the U.S. state of California.

References

External links

 
 Dr. Sun Yat-sen - San Francisco, California ay Waymarking

1937 establishments in California
1937 sculptures
Chinatown, San Francisco
Cultural depictions of Sun Yat-sen
Monuments and memorials in California
Outdoor sculptures in San Francisco
Sculptures of men in California
Statues in San Francisco
Statues of presidents